Fortson is an unincorporated community in Snohomish County, Washington, United States.

Notes

Unincorporated communities in Snohomish County, Washington
Unincorporated communities in Washington (state)